This is a list of an Arab dynasty, the Shi'ite caliphs of the Fatimid dynasty (909–1171). The Shi'ite caliphs were also regarded at the same time as the imams of the Isma'ili branch of Shi'a Islam.

Family tree of Fatimid caliphs

See also
List of Caliphs
List of rulers of Egypt
List of Ismaili imams

Notes

References

Fatmid caliphs
Fatimid caliphs
Fatimid caliphs
Fatimid caliphs
Medieval Islamic world-related lists